Iva Kitchell (March 31, 1908 in Junction City, Kansas – November 19, 1983 in Daytona Beach, Florida) was a concert dancer, dance satirist and comedian.

Biography
Born as Emma Baugh, Iva Kitchell was adopted by Robert W. Kitchells, at the age of three. Following years of difficult amateur activity, she found work in the ballet corps of the Chicago Civic Opera Ballet in 1922.

Kitchell was fond of amusing herself by mocking the seriousness of the performances, and was encouraged to develop her talent for comedic mimicry, rather than reprimanded. This was the beginning of her career performing comedic one-woman shows.

Kitchell eventually became a featured performer at Radio City Music Hall. She also worked with American Ballet Theatre and gave recitals at Jacob’s Pillow. She performed her one-woman shows extensively in the United States and Europe, including a notable recital at New York’s Carnegie Hall in 1946. She often billed herself as being assisted by the “Invisible Ballet Company." Kitchell frequently performed without a program, spontaneously selecting from among approximately 50 works, with titles such as, "Fantasy for Body and Piano," "Valse Triste, as shown on a home movie projector," "Bacchanale at the Opera," "Oriental Dance (by an Occidental Girl)," "Pseudo-Voodoo," and "Non-Objective." Ballet and ballerinas were frequent targets for her parody, as was modernist choreographer Martha Graham.

Kitchell told a Time Magazine interviewer in 1946 "I just think there is something completely ridiculous about anything that is too serious."

Kitchell married painter and aeronautical engineer Stokely Webster in 1933. The couple adopted a daughter. After retiring from public performing in 1958, Kitchell ran a ballet studio in Huntington, Long Island, and later she and Webster relocated to Florida.

Footnotes

External links
 Iva Kitchell Papers at the Newberry Library

1908 births
1983 deaths
American female dancers
Dancers from Kansas
American women comedians
20th-century American comedians
20th-century American dancers
20th-century American women